Garnant is a rural locality in the Rockhampton Region, Queensland, Australia. In the  Garnant had a population of 99 people.

History 
Garnant State School opened on 11 September 1930 and closed on 1969. The school which opened at Ridgelands (as it was then known and now a locality to the south of Garnant) was called Garnant after the town Garnant in Glamorganishire, Wales, which was the home town of local resident Abraham Jones who took a leading role in establishing the school. Presumably the locality took its name from the school. The school building was relocated from neighbouring Morinish where the Morinish State School had closed in 1928. The school was located on Evans Road.

In the  Garnant had a population of 99 people.

References 

Suburbs of Rockhampton Region
Localities in Queensland